Fahmi bin Ali Al-Jowder is a Bahraini politician.

Career
Jowder served as the minister of works in Bahrain from 2001 to 2011. He was appointed minister for electricity and water affairs in November 2010. his qualifications also include a Master of Science degree (MSc).

References

King Hamad drops four ministers 

Living people
Bahraini politicians
Government ministers of Bahrain
Year of birth missing (living people)